Mhardeh Subdistrict  is a Syrian nahiyah (Subdistrict) located in Mhardeh District in Hama.  According to the Syria Central Bureau of Statistics (CBS), Mhardeh Subdistrict had a population of 80.165 in the 2004 census.

References 

Mahardah
Mahardah District